

Karl Eibl (23 July 1891 – 21 January 1943) was an Austrian general in the Wehrmacht of Nazi Germany during World War II. He was a recipient of the Knight's Cross of the Iron Cross with Oak Leaves and Swords.  He also served in World War 1 as an officer in the Austrian Landwehrregiment 21.

Eibl was killed north-west of Stalingrad on 21 January 1943, during the chaotic retreat forced by the Russian offensive, Operation Little Saturn, when Italian soldiers mistook his command vehicle for a Soviet armored car and blew it up with hand grenades. There is a memorial monument dedicated to him in the city park of Krems, Austria. However, the causes on the death of EIbl are still controversary. According to References sourced from "General NASCI's daily reports and bulletins of the Italian Alpinjaeger corps in Russia", the General Eibl was killed on the night of 21 January 1943 because he was blown up on an unexploded bomb.  The explosion wounded him in a foot and later on, he was transported to Krawzowka, where he underwent the amputation of his foot; he died.

Awards
 
 Infantry Assault Badge
 Wound Badge (1939) in Black
 Iron Cross (1939) 2nd Class (23 September 1939) & 1st Class (5 November 1939)
 Knight's Cross of the Iron Cross with Oak Leaves and Swords
 Knight's Cross on 15 August 1940 as Oberstleutnant and commander of the III./Infanterie-Regiment 131
 Oak Leaves on 31 December 1941 as Oberst and commander of Infanterie-Regiment 132
 Swords on 19 December 1942 as Generalmajor and commander of 385. Infanterie-Division

References

Citations

Bibliography

 
 Mitcham, Samuel W. (2007). Rommel's Desert Commanders — The Men Who Served the Desert Fox, North Africa, 1941–42. Mechanicsburg, PA: Stackpole Books. .
 
 

1891 births
1943 deaths
German Army generals of World War II
Generals of Infantry (Wehrmacht)
Austrian military personnel killed in World War II
Recipients of the Knight's Cross of the Iron Cross with Oak Leaves and Swords
People from Gmunden District
Austro-Hungarian military personnel of World War I
Austrian military personnel
Austro-Hungarian Army officers
Military personnel killed by friendly fire
Deaths by hand grenade
Accidental deaths in the Soviet Union
Accidental deaths in Russia
Theresian Military Academy alumni
Friendly fire incidents of World War II